Aix Maurienne Savoie Basket, commonly known as AMSB, is a basketball club based in Aix-les-Bains, Savoie, France that plays in the LNB Pro B.  Their home arena is Halle Marlioz.

Season by season

Notable players
- Set a club record or won an individual award as a professional player.
- Played at least one official international match for his senior national team at any time.

 Tiegbe Bamba
 Joachim Ekanga-Ehawa
 David Ramseyer

External links
Official site 

Basketball teams in France
Basketball teams established in 1969
Aix-les-Bains
Sport in Savoie
1969 establishments in France